Brutality or brutal most commonly refers to:
 Violence, physical force unlawfully exercised toward property and/or persons
 Battery (crime)
 Police brutality

Brutality or brutal may also refer to:

Media
 Brutal: Paws of Fury, a 1994 video game
 Brutality (film), a 1912 film
 Brutal (Black Uhuru album), 1986
 Brutal (Dr. Sin album), 1995
 "Brutal" (song), a 2021 Olivia Rodrigo song

Other uses
 Brutality (Mortal Kombat), a finishing move in the video game Mortal Kombat
 Brutalist architecture, an architectural style

See also